Onesimos was an ancient Athenian vase painter who flourished c. 500–480 BC. He specialized in decorating cups, mostly of Type B, which comprise virtually all known examples of his work. 

Like many of his fellow red-figure painters, Onesimos emphasized realistically rendered, active figures, and depicted tableaux drawn from daily life as well as scenes from mythology. A number of the pieces painted by Onesimos bear the signature of Euphronios as potter. In light of this evidence of the two artists' close collaboration, as well as similarities in their painting styles, many researchers believe that Onesimos learned his trade as Euphronios's pupil. Similarly, the works of the later Antiphon Painter bear a close stylistic resemblance to those of Onesimos, suggesting that Onesimos may have served as a teacher in his own right.

See also
 Kylix depicting athletic combats by Onesimos

References
The Getty Museum - Biography of Onesimos

6th-century BC births
5th-century BC deaths
Ancient Greek vase painters